This is a chronological list of known riots in Sweden.

Pre-2000s
Ebel riot
Rabulist riots
March Unrest
Easter Riots
Båstad riots

2000s
2008 Malmö mosque riots
2009 Malmö anti-Israel riots

2010s
2010 Rinkeby riots
May 2013 Stockholm riots
December 2013 Stockholm riots
2016 riots in Sweden
2017 Rinkeby riots

2020s
2020 Sweden riots
2022 Sweden riots

Riots and civil disorder in Sweden
Sweden